Adventures in Rhythm is an album by bandleader, composer, arranger and conductor Pete Rugolo featuring performances recorded in 1954 and originally released on the Columbia label as a 12-inch LP.

Reception

The Allmusic review by Scott Yanow noted: "Pete Rugolo's arrangements are full of surprises while leaving space for his sidemen's short solos. Well worth searching for".

Track listing
All compositions by Pete Rugolo except where noted.
 "Here's Pete" - 2:25
 "My Funny Valentine" (Richard Rodgers, Lorenz Hart) - 2:51
 "Mixin' the Blues" - 3:13
 "Poinciana (Song of the Tree)" (Nat Simon, Buddy Bernier) - 3:20
 "Rugolo Meets Shearing" (Herman Saunders, Lloyd Lunham, Rugolo) - 2:49
 "Sambamba" (Les Baxter) - 2:24
 "King Porter Stomp" (Jelly Roll Morton) - 2:49
 "You Are Too Beautiful" (Rodgers, Hart) - 2:53
 "Jingle Bells Mambo" - 2:52
 "There Will Never Be Another You" (Harry Warren, Mack Gordon) - 2:22
 "Conversation" (José Ferrer) - 3:52
 "Good Evening Friends Boogie" - 3:22
Recorded in Los Angeles, CA on April 28, 1954 (tracks 7 & 12), April 29, 1954 (tracks 2, 4 & 9), May 10, 1954 (tracks 3 & 5), June 21, 1954 (tracks 1, 8, 10 & 11)  and July 8, 1954 (track 6).

Personnel
Pete Rugolo - arranger, conductor
Pete Candoli, Maynard Ferguson, Conrad Gozzo, Shorty Rogers - trumpet 
Milt Bernhart, Harry Betts, John Haliburton, Herbie Harper - trombone
Fred Fox, John Graas  - French horn
Paul Sarmento - tuba
Harry Klee, Bud Shank - alto saxophone, flute
Bob Cooper - tenor saxophone, oboe  
Jimmy Giuffre - tenor saxophone, baritone saxophone
Bob Gordon - baritone saxophone
Claude Williamson - piano
Howard Roberts - guitar
Harry Babasin - bass
Shelly Manne - drums
Bernie Mattison - percussion

References

Pete Rugolo albums
1955 albums
Columbia Records albums
Albums arranged by Pete Rugolo
Albums conducted by Pete Rugolo